Raymond Razafimbahiny (1919–1963) better known as R.R. Majunga was an artist known beyond the borders of his native Madagascar. Among the premier, if not the leading bilingual (French/Malagasy) composers and pianist of his era, he was also a poet and classically trained-violinist and self-taught pianist. R.R. Majunga's life story and development as a composer are closely intertwined with Madagascar's birth as a nation: the colonial period, the rebellion against French rule, the attainment of independence, and the first years of independence. He lost his father who was tortured, shot and finally buried in a common grave by the French colonial government for his part in the resistance movement. At the time of his father's death Raymond Razafimbahiny found himself as a young adult in charge of his family and numerous younger brothers and sisters as he made his way to the town that he saw holding great promise: Majunga. Majunga is considered by many to be the heart of Madagascar. Complicating his life story is the time spent fighting on behalf of France in the Indochina War and in Algeria.

The 1950s ambiance of Majunga, a time of both heightened patriotism, and family responsibility combined to have a great influence on the composer. He married his childhood sweetheart Jeanne Ralinoro (1925–1991) who became the mother of his four children. He died at the age of 42 from a heart attack.

Musician 

The music of R.R Majunga was at its popularity in the 1950s and early 1960s. He composed numerous songs in the kalon' ny fahiny hira tranaina traditional Malagasy piano music style and the popular hiragasy style. 

He also mixed in other styles of music that were popular in the French colonies at the time such as the cha cha cha, mambo and jazz as can be heard by his use of the so-called "blue note of jazz."

Songs like Malagasy Anie Ianao, Ny Fytia and Fantenana are considered Malagasy classics. Malagasy Anie Ianao with its focus on Malagasy pride is considered an unofficial anthem in Madagascar. 

Veloma Dada Havoka was written as a tribute to his father who never received a proper burial. He also wrote about hope (Fanantenana) and of course the notorious joie de vivre of his adopted hometown Majunga. 

His wife was a constant inspiration as she is the subject of his compositions like Tsiambaratelo, Fitia, Tsy Anjara. He also wrote about their separation during the Indochine war in "Laise-moi partir" (let me go).

Musical legacy 
The songs of R. R. Majunga remain well known in Madagascar and throughout the Indian Ocean. In 1995, a collection of up-and-coming Malagasy musicians led by the renowned Silo produced an R. R. Majunga tribute album. In addition, songs such as Malagasy anie ianao have been interpreted by the likes of the Malagasy band Tarika Be. Again, in the fall of 2009, a group of up-and-coming artists paid tribute to Majunga in a concert in the Malagasy capital of Antananarivo.

In Canada, the Canadian musical group Raivo led by Maggy Razafimbahiny and her husband Dean Pallen, the musical arranger and saxophonist of the group have recorded CDs of largely Majunga compositions mixed in with original compositions. The albums are entitled Hommage (2002) and Mahabibo (2008). Ms. Razafimbahiny is also the daughter of R.R. Majunga and her sister Lydia is also a member of RAIVO. In order to have access to the full extent of R.R. Majunga's repertoire Raivo had his original 78-inch recordings sent to a company in Newmarket, Ontario, to be restored and digitally transferred to the CD format. The 78s were recorded on the Decca label that sometimes combined the work of R.R. Majunga with other leading Malagasy musicians like Henri Ratsimabazafy.

R.R Majunga's Main Repertoire 

-Fahiny sy ankehitriny
– Fanantenana
– Fitia Voarara
– Hatanorana
– Hiombona
– Ireny Mahantra Ireny
– Laisse-moi partir
– Mahabibo
– Majunga
– Malagasy Anie Ianao
– Mananjary
– Mandalo miserana ihany
– Moa Ve Hadisoako
– Mora Mora Doucement
– Nofy Tsindrindriana
– Ny Fitia
– Ny Lamba
– Trano kely ravarava
– Tsiambaratelo
– Veloma Dada Havako
– Valiha sy Lokanga

Malagasy musicians
1919 births
1963 deaths
Place of birth missing
20th-century pianists